Kolukhi (also Romanized as Kolūkhī) is a village in Darzab Rural District, in the Central District of Mashhad County, Razavi Khorasan Province, Iran. At the 2006 census, its population was 140, in 40 families.

References 

Populated places in Mashhad County